Ernest Appiah Nuamah (born 1 November 2003) is a Ghanaian professional footballer who plays as a forward for FC Nordsjælland.

Career 
Nuamah started his career with Right to Dream Academy before joining FC Nordsjælland in January 2022. He made his debut on 10 April 2022 when he came on in the 67th minute for Magnus Kofod Andersen to score an 84th minute goal in a 2–2 draw to Aarhus GF. He was adjudged as the team's man of the match at the end of the match. on 19th March 2023, Nuamah scored two goals including the winning goal in a 2-1 win against Brondby.

References

External links 

 
 
 FC Nordsjælland profile

2003 births
Living people
Ghanaian footballers
Ghanaian expatriate footballers
Association football forwards
Danish Superliga players
Right to Dream Academy players
FC Nordsjælland players
Ghanaian expatriate sportspeople in Denmark
Expatriate men's footballers in Denmark